Andres Saag (born 21 November 1955) is an Estonian mycologist.

He has recombined the following taxon: Nephromopsis yunnanensis (Nyl.) Randlane & Saag, 1992.

References

Estonian mycologists
1955 births
University of Tartu alumni
Academic staff of the University of Tartu
Living people